Ottosson may refer to:

Anna Ottosson (born 1976), Swedish alpine skier, 2006 Winter Olympics bronze medallist
Jan Ottosson (born 1960), former Swedish Cross-country skier
Kristofer Ottosson (born 1976), Swedish former professional ice hockey player
Paul N. J. Ottosson (born 1966), Swedish sound engineer
Sebastian Ottosson (born 1992), Swedish professional ice hockey player
Ulf Ottosson (born 1968), retired Swedish football striker

Swedish-language surnames